The Lying Stones of Marrakech (2000) is the ninth volume of collected essays by the Harvard paleontologist, Stephen Jay Gould. The essays were culled from his monthly column "The View of Life" in Natural History magazine, to which Gould contributed for 27 years. The book deals with themes familiar to Gould's writing: evolution and its teaching, science biography, probability, and iconoclasm.

Reviews
Book review - by Christine Kenneally, The New York Times
A Gouldian Valediction, Almost - by Henry Gee, Nature
Essay Summaries - by Lawrence N. Goeller
Book review - by Jim Walker

External links
Book excerpt - Random House Press
Profile Page (with introduction) - Unofficial Stephen Jay Gould Archive
Video interview about the book - Charlie Rose

2000 non-fiction books
American essay collections
Books by Stephen Jay Gould
English-language books
Works originally published in Natural History (magazine)